RV Borys Aleksandrov is a Ukrainian research vessel which was built in 1984. She was previously manned by the Belgian Naval Component as RV Belgica and is in active service.

Description
The ship is propelled by a  ABC 6M DZC1000-150 diesel engine, driving a kort nozzle ducted propeller. She has a  bow and stern thruster and a  electric motor.

She is fitted with a Kongsberg EM 1002 and EM 3002 sonar and an acoustic doppler current profiler. There are five laboratories on board. Power is provided by two diesel powered generators of  each.

History
Belgica was built by Boelwerf, Temse. She was launched on 6 January 1984 and commissioned on 5 July 1984. Her homeport is Zeebrugge. She is allocated the IMO Number 8222563, MMSI Number 205218000 and Pennant number A962. Belgica uses the callsign ORGQ. She was named after the RV Belgica, a ship used by Adrien de Gerlache in the Belgian Antarctic Expedition (1897–99).

Belgica is operated by the Management Unit of North Sea Mathematical Models (MUMM) and crewed by the Belgian Naval Component.

In 2013 mechanical problems caused the aging vessel to be taken out of service for four weeks, which prompted the Belgian government to plan her replacement by 2017. This has later been postponed to 2020.

References

External links

Current position of Belgica 
Complete details of Belgica (in Dutch)

1984 ships
Ships built in Belgium
Research vessels of Belgium
Auxiliary ships of the Belgian Navy
Research vessels of Ukraine